Zoltán Péter (born 23 March 1958 in Zalaistvánd, Hungary) is a retired Hungarian football defender who played for Zalaegerszegi and First Vienna. He also represented Hungary in the 1986 FIFA World Cup.

References

External links
 

1958 births
Living people
Hungarian footballers
Hungarian expatriate footballers
Hungary international footballers
Association football defenders
Zalaegerszegi TE players
First Vienna FC players
Hungarian expatriate sportspeople in Austria
Expatriate footballers in Austria
1986 FIFA World Cup players
Sportspeople from Zala County